Heinz Harold Heimann Ochaita is a Guatemalan writer and academic. He served as presidential spokesperson for the Jimmy Morales government from January 14, 2016, until June 19, 2018.

During his tenure as presidential spokesman, he attracted some controversy over his brief statements on the decisions or opinions of Morales. He was dismissed by the Secretariat of Social Communication of the Presidency of Guatemala after issuing statements explaining that the government respected the immigration policies of U.S. President Donald Trump, in which more than 2,000 Guatemalan children were separated from their families. This was criticized by various national and international actors. The Guatemalan government subsequently issued a statement distancing themselves from the statements and also announcing their dismissal of Heimann.

References

Living people
Year of birth missing (living people)
People from Guatemala City
Guatemalan academics
Guatemalan male writers